The 1990 Benson & Hedges Cup was the nineteenth edition of cricket's Benson & Hedges Cup.

The competition was won by Lancashire County Cricket Club.

Fixtures and results

Group stage

Group A

Source:

Group B

Source:

Group C

Source:

Group D

Source:

Quarter-finals

Semi-finals

Final

References

See also
 Benson & Hedges Cup

Benson & Hedges Cup seasons
1990 in English cricket